Zharaskan Abdirash was a Soviet-era Kazakh poet. His work was banned during the Soviet period. His son, director Rustem Abdrashitov, made a film about his father's life in 2004, entitled Rebirth Island (Kazakh: Каладан келген кыз; Russian: Остров Возрождения).

Published works
 Koktem tynysy: zhas aqyndar zhinaghy. Almaty: "Zhazushy" baspasy, 1975.
 Dala, sening ulyngmyn. Almaty: "Zhazushy" baspasy, 1975.
 Sana soqpaghy. Almaty: "Zhalyn", 1998.
 Kongil kokpary: tangdamaly. Almaty: "Zhalyn", 1998.

External links
 Rebirth Island on IMDB

References

Kazakh-language poets